Paula Julia Vesala (born December 10, 1981) is a Finnish singer-songwriter, actress, and playwright. She was one of two singers and main lyricist in the pop rock duo PMMP along with Mira Luoti. Her solo career began in 2015 under the stage name "Vesala". She has composed songs for other well-known Finnish artists such as Vesa-Matti Loiri, Jenni Vartiainen, and Antti Tuisku.

Career

Education
Vesala attended the Sibelius Academy in Helsinki, where she studied music education and classical singing as well as the piano and violin. Since 2011, she has studied dramaturgy at the Helsinki Theatre Academy and later at University of California, Los Angeles. Her 10-minute play "English Lesson" was chosen among seven others as one of the best in the national Theater Masters 10-minute playwriting competition.

Pohjois-Savon Ammattikorkeakoulu (Savonia Polytechinc) Music Pedagogy / major: classical singing 2000 – 2002
Sibelius Academy: Department: Music Education / major: music education 2002 – 2011
The Helsinki Theatre Academy: Dramaturgy degree program / major: dramaturgy and playwriting 2011 – 2014
UCLA-University of California, Los Angeles in MFA Playwriting program at TFT (School of Theater, Film and Television) 2014 – 2017

PMMP (2002–2013)

PMMP was a Finnish band fronted by singers Paula Vesala and Mira Luoti and backed by musicians Mikko Virta, Juho Vehmanen and Heikki Kytölä. PMMP has been called one of the biggest and most important bands of the 2000s, as the band had a huge impact on the music scene in Finland. PMMP's albums were produced by Jori Sjöroos, who also wrote the music for all songs. The lyrics are written by Paula and Mira, mostly Paula. The name of the band is often said to be an abbreviation of the phrase "Paulan ja Miran Molemmat Puolet" (both sides of Paula and Mira). In an interview on Finnish talk show Krisse Show, they stated that the name of the band is derived from the names of its members: Paula, Mira, Mira, Paula, similarly to ABBA.

PMMP first became well known in Finland for the 2003 summer hit Rusketusraidat (Tan Lines). They then enjoyed great success with their second album Kovemmat kädet (Rougher Hands), which went gold (double platinum in 2010). An extended version of the album was released in August 2005. Oo siellä jossain mun, a single from the aforementioned album, is PMMP's biggest hit so far in Finland.

In November 2006, PMMP released their third album Leskiäidin tyttäret (Daughters of a widowed mother), which went platinum on the day it was released.

They released an album labeled Puuhevonen (Wooden Horse) featuring contemporary takes on traditional children's songs in 2007, around the time their first children were born. In 2009, they released their fourth rock/pop album Veden varaan (Overboard, or Afloat) and their fifth album Rakkaudesta (Out of love, or About love) was released in 2012.

The band was an acclaimed live act. PMMP played their final concert on October 27, 2013, at the Helsinki Ice Hall which, along with an additional show on the night before, sold out within the first minutes after ticket sales opened.

In 2013, PMMP was awarded by the Ministry of Education and Culture in Helsinki with the Finland Prize. The Prize gives recognition to important figures in the Finnish cultural landscape across widely varying fields. The pop-duo were "commended for offering new role models for young women."

Awards 
PMMP has won a total of nine Finnish Grammys. The categories are:
2003 – Pop-rock newcomer
2005 – Album of the year Kovemmat kädet (Rougher Hands), Pop album Kovemmat kädet and Best band
2006 – Album of the year Leskiäidin tyttäret (Daughters of a widowed mother) and Pop album Leskiäidin tyttäret
2009 – Album of the year Veden varaan (Overboard, or Afloat), Rock album Veden varaan and Best band

Solo career (2015–present)
In October 2015, Paula Vesala announced that in the future she would make music under the stage name Vesala. Her first single "Tequila", written and composed by her, was released on October 23, 2015, and her first solo album on June 17, 2016. The album sold platinum in just over a month.

As a lyricist and composer 
Paula Vesala has composed and written songs for other artists such as Johanna Kurkela, Jenni Vartiainen, Vesa-Matti Loiri, Martti Saarinen, Katri Ylander, Tiktak, Petra, Antti Tuisku, Anna Abreu, Uusi Fantasia, Freeman, Katri Helena, Jippu, Samuli Edelmann, Stig, Jesse Kaikuranta and Aṣa. She has composed music for Finnish theater, including for the play Neljäs Tie directed by  shown at the Finnish National Theatre in 2013. In 2016, she received the Juha Vainio Award, an annual award given to a significant Finnish lyricist. Vesala was the 26th person and the 5th woman to receive the award.

As an actress 
Vesala acted in a silent film called Myrsk (Tempest) by director Elina Oikari at TaiK in 2013, playing the role of Prince Ferdinand. She has provided the Finnish voice for several movies including Tinker Bell, Happily N'Ever After, Arthur and the Minimoys, High School Musical 1, 2 and 3. She translated Benny Andersson's, 's and Björn Ulvaeus' musical Kristina från Duvemåla, and the ABBA songs in the musical Mamma Mia! from Swedish to Finnish for Svenska Teatern.

Other projects

Kerkko Koskinen Kollektiivi
Kerkko Koskinen Kollektiivi (Kollektiivi for short) is a Finnish band formed by Kerkko Koskinen (Ultra Bra) with Vuokko Hovatta (Ultra Bra), Paula Vesala (PMMP) and Manna. In January 2014, Paula Vesala informed that she had left the group. She was replaced by Maija Vilkkumaa.

Kollektiivi has released two albums, Kerkko Koskinen Kollektiivi (which won the Finnish gold record music prize) in 2012 and 2 in 2014.

Vain elämää
In 2014, Paula Vesala took part in the 3rd season of Vain elämää with Samuli Edelmann, Elastinen, Paula Koivuniemi, Vesa-Matti Loiri, Jenni Vartiainen, and Toni Wirtanen. The season aired from September 19, 2014, to November 7, 2014. At the end of the 3rd season, the compilation album Vain Elämää – Kausi 3 (ilta) was released under the label WEA / Warner. The album topped the Finnish Albums Chart. The compilation album Vain Elämää – Kausi 3 (päivä) that reached number two in Finnish Albums Chart was released.

Personal life
Paula Vesala is from the Finnish town of Kärsämäki. On November 8, 2014, Paula Vesala married her longtime partner Lauri Ylönen, the lead singer of The Rasmus in Las Vegas; the couple filed a marriage statement on December 29, 2014, and the marriage was registered in Helsinki on January 5, 2015. They have a son Julius, who was born in April 2008. The family moved to Los Angeles in Autumn 2014.
On September 26, 2016, the couple announced their divorce after a 12-year relationship through an official statement.

Discography

Albums

Singles

Filmography

Films

TV Series

Animation films

Bibliography

References

External links
 
PMMP's official website 
Paula's biography 

1981 births
Living people
People from Kärsämäki
21st-century Finnish women singers
Finnish songwriters
Finnish pop singers
Finnish expatriates in the United States